David Peterson is a Canadian politician.

David Peterson may also refer to:

 David Peterson (baseball) (born 1995), baseball player
 David C. Peterson (born 1949), American photographer, winner of the Pulitzer Prize for Feature Photography.
 D.J. Peterson (1959–1993), American professional wrestler
 David J. Peterson (born 1981), American linguist and author of constructed languages
 David McKelvey Peterson (1894–1919), American World War I flying ace
 David G. Peterson (born 1944), scholar of the New Testament
 David L. Peterson (born 1954), research biologist
 David A. M. Peterson (born 1973), American political scientist
 Dave Peterson (ice hockey) (1931–1997), American ice hockey coach

See also
 David Paterson (born 1954), governor of New York State
 David Petersen (disambiguation)
 Dave Petersen, English rugby league footballer